Grand Falls Portage is a settlement in Victoria County, New Brunswick, Canada.

History

Notable people

See also
List of communities in New Brunswick

References

Communities in Victoria County, New Brunswick